Shattuck is an archaic word for grapefruit.  It can also refer to:

People
 Aaron Draper Shattuck, American painter
 Corinna Shattuck, American missionary
 Dwayne Shattuck, television producer
 Erasmus Darwin Shattuck (1824–1900), American politician
 Francis Kittredge Shattuck (1824–1898), American politician
 Henry Lee Shattuck, politician
 Jessica Shattuck, author
 Job Shattuck, rebel
 John Shattuck, American educator
 Kim Shattuck (1963–2019), American singer
 Lemuel Shattuck (1793–1859), Boston politician, historian, bookseller and publisher
 Lillian Shattuck, violinist
 Lydia White Shattuck (1822–1889), American botanist
 Mayo A. Shattuck III, businessman
 Molly Shattuck, socialite
 Paul Shattuck, American autism researcher
 Roger Shattuck (1923–2005), American writer
 Roy Lloyd Shattuck (1871–1915), American politician
 Samuel Walker Shattuck (1841–1913), American mathematician 
 Shari Shattuck, American actress, writer
 Truly Shattuck musical actress

Places
 Shattuck, Oklahoma
 Shattuck Avenue, a street in Berkeley, California
 Shattuckville, an area in Colrain, Massachusetts

Things 
 Shattuck-Saint Mary's
 Shattuck House
Franklyn C. Shattuck House
 Shattuck Observatory, an early observatory at Dartmouth College, Hanover, NH, USA